Psallus perrisi is a Palearctic species of true bug.

References

Phylini
Hemiptera of Europe
Insects described in 1852